David Luckwell (born 15 January 1975) is a former professional rugby league footballer who played in the 1990s and 2000s.

Playing career
David Luckwell played for Wales at the 2000 Rugby League World Cup.

References

External links
The Teams: Wales

1975 births
Living people
Batley Bulldogs players
Hull Kingston Rovers players
Place of birth missing (living people)
Rugby articles needing expert attention
Rugby league props
Rugby league second-rows
Wales national rugby league team players